On My Way is the second album released by Ben Kweller. All songs were written by Ben Kweller.

Recording process
On My Way was recorded at the same studio (Sear Sound) as Sha Sha, but the approach was completely different. "I really wanted to capture the band that had been backing me up for the past year and a half. We recorded everything live, in one room without headphones and hardly any overdubs. I'm very proud of On My Way's spontaneity and honesty. I'm especially proud of the song "On My Way". I feel it's one of my best."

Touring
The touring band for the album featured John Kent from Radish and Jason Roberts on guitar. On My Way was their first headlining tour in France. Ben Kweller also co-headlined with Death Cab For Cutie and Incubus in the US. Kweller also performed in  Japan with the Yeah Yeah Yeahs and the White Stripes.  Towards the end of touring, Kweller opened for The Black Crowes at one of their Hammerstein reunion shows.

Track listing

"I Need You Back"  – 3:17
"Hospital Bed"  – 3:37
"My Apartment"  – 3:57
"On My Way"  – 3:54
"The Rules"  – 2:37
"Down"  – 4:08
"Living Life"  – 4:02
"Ann Disaster"  – 3:08
"Believer"  – 4:59
"Hear Me Out"  – 3:44
"Different but the Same"  – 5:02

Personnel
Ben Kweller - Lead Vocals, Guitar, Harmonica, Piano, Art Direction
Josh Lattanzi - Bass guitar, Vocals
Mike Stroud - Guitar, Vocals
John Kent - Drums
Fred Eltringham - Drums
Steve Mazur - Engineer
Steve Ralbovsky - A&R
Brett Kilroe - Art Direction
Greg Calbi - Mastering
Ethan Johns - Percussion, Mixing, Engineer, Producer

Charts

References

Ben Kweller albums
2004 albums
Albums produced by Ethan Johns
ATO Records albums